Murder in Successville is a British sitcom with improvisational elements created by Andy Brereton and Avril Spary. The series aired on BBC Three from 6 May 2015 to 24 May 2017. Murder in Successville stars Tom Davis as DI Desmond Sleet who is partnered with a guest celebrity every episode to solve a murder. The cast of every episode includes impersonations of various celebrities who live in the fictional Successville.

Celebrities are transposed into fictional versions that fit into the setting of Successville, such as Alan Carr who in Successville's universe is a mobster and brother to Jimmy Carr. Liam Hourican appears as Police Chief Gordon Ramsay in each episode, introducing the guest celebrity at the start and revealing whether they have picked the correct killer at each episode's conclusion.

Cast
Celebrities who have participated include Jamie Laing, Greg James, Deborah Meaden, Dermot O'Leary, Chris Kamara, Richard Osman and Martin Kemp.

All episodes are set in the modern day, except the series 3 episode with Martin Kemp, who travelled back in time to the first murder in Successville.

Episodes

Series overview

Series 1 (2015)

Series 2 (2016)

Series 3 (2017)

American adaptation 

In January 2022, it was announced that Netflix would be making an American adaptation of the series, titled Murderville. Murderville does away with the original series' concept of all the town residents being celebrity impersonations; instead, the townspeople (including all the murder suspects) are simply fictional characters.

The Netflix adaptation is produced by and stars Will Arnett as the character senior detective Terry Seattle and features guest stars Conan O'Brien, Annie Murphy, Ken Jeong, Kumail Nanjiani, Marshawn Lynch and Sharon Stone. All six episodes of Murderville premiered on 3 February 2022.

References

External links
 
 
 
 

2010s British comedy television series
2015 British television series debuts
2017 British television series endings
BBC television sitcoms
2010s British mystery television series
English-language television shows
2010s British crime television series
Murder in television
Improvisational television series
Television series by Tiger Aspect Productions